World Series of Fighting 6: Burkman vs. Carl was a mixed martial arts event held  in Coral Gables, Florida, United States.

Background

This event featured the first WSOF Championship bout between Josh Burkman and Steve Carl.

Results

See also 
 World Series of Fighting
 List of WSOF champions
 List of WSOF events

References

Events in Coral Gables, Florida
World Series of Fighting events
2013 in mixed martial arts